Justine Henin was the defending champion, but retired from the sport on May 14, 2008.

Dinara Safina won in the final 6–2, 6–1, against Dominika Cibulková.

Seeds
The top eight seeds received a bye into the second round.

Draw

Finals

Top half

Section 1

Section 2

Bottom half

Section 3

Section 4

External links
Draw and Qualifying Draw

Cup - Singles